William John Gunnell (1 October 1933 – 28 January 2008) was a Labour Party politician in the United Kingdom.

Early life
He was born in Birmingham, and educated at King Edward's School, Birmingham. He gained a BSc in General Studies in 1955, and a PGCE in 1958 from the University of Leeds. As a conscientious objector during National Service he was a hospital porter at St Bartholomew's Hospital, London. In the 1960s he was a chemistry teacher at the United Nations International School in New York City. From 1970 to 1988 he was a Lecturer in the School of Education at the University of Leeds.

From 1977 to 1986 he was a councillor on West Yorkshire County Council, being the leader 1981–86. He was also a councillor on Leeds City Council 1986–92.

Parliamentary career
Gunnell initially stood for Parliament at Leeds North East in February and October 1974, but was beaten by Sir Keith Joseph on both attempts.

At the 1992 election he was returned as Member of Parliament (MP) for Morley and Leeds South.  That constituency was abolished at the 1997 election, and he was re-elected for the new Morley and Rothwell constituency. At the 2001 election he retired due to ill-health, and the seat was held for Labour by Colin Challen.

Personal life
He was married with three sons and one daughter. He was a keen follower of sport, being a Member of both Yorkshire and Warwickshire County Cricket Clubs. He supported West Bromwich Albion Football Club as a child and watched most of Leeds United's home games between 1970 and 2005.

Gunnell died on 28 January 2008 in Wakefield aged 74.

External links 
 
 They Work For You
 Ask Aristotle
 Obituary from The Independent: 

1933 births
2008 deaths
Alumni of the University of Leeds
Academics of the University of Leeds
British conscientious objectors
Labour Party (UK) MPs for English constituencies
UK MPs 1992–1997
UK MPs 1997–2001
Councillors in Leeds
Councillors in West Yorkshire
People educated at King Edward's School, Birmingham